Samiksha or Sameksha or Sameeksha may refer to:

 Sameeksha Sud, Indian actress
 Samiksha Bhatnagar, Indian actress
 Sameksha (born 1985), Indian actress